Events from the 1530s in England.

Incuments
 Monarch – Henry VIII
 Parliament – Reformation (until 14 April 1536), 6th of King Henry VIII (starting 8 June, until 18 July 1536), 7th of King Henry VIII (starting 28 April 1539)

Events
 1530
 26 January – Thomas Boleyn, 1st Earl of Wiltshire becomes Keeper of the Privy Seal.
 January – the first printed translation of the Torah into English, by William Tyndale, is published in Antwerp for distribution in Britain.
 6 February – Charles Brandon becomes Lord President of the Council.
 4 November – Cardinal Wolsey arrested as a traitor for secretly communicating with Pope Clement VII.
 Parliament of England passes the Egyptians Act in attempt to expel Gypsies.
 1531
 11 February – Henry VIII recognised as supreme head of the Church of England.
 March – Statute Against Vagabonds requires registration of all genuine beggars; unlicensed beggars to be whipped or pilloried.
 Sir Thomas Elyot's treatise The Boke Named the Governour is published, the first English work concerning moral philosophy.
 Construction of the Great Hall of Hampton Court begins.
 1532
 15 April – Submission of the Clergy: royal approval required for all ecclesiastical laws.
 16 May – Sir Thomas More resigns as Lord Chancellor.
 20 May – Thomas Audley appointed Lord Keeper of the Great Seal.
 1 September – Anne Boleyn is created Marquess of Pembroke by Henry VIII.
 14 November – King Henry VIII secretly marries Anne Boleyn.
 Henry VIII grants the Thorne brothers a Royal Charter to found Bristol Grammar School.
 Stamford School is founded by William Radcliffe.
 Construction of Saint James's Palace begins.
 German painter Hans Holbein the Younger settles permanently in England.
 1533
 25 January – King Henry VIII formally but secretly marries Anne Boleyn, his second Queen consort, at Whitehall Palace.
 6 February – Act in Restraint of Appeals declares England to be a wholly independent "empire".
 30 March – Thomas Cranmer becomes Archbishop of Canterbury.
 April – The Statute in Restraint of Appeals declares the king to be the supreme sovereign and forbids judicial appeals to the papacy.
 11 April – Henry VIII informs the Royal Council that Anne Boleyn must be recognized as his wife and queen.
 12 April (Easter Eve)
 Anne Boleyn (who is now pregnant) makes her first appearance as queen before the royal court at Greenwich.
 Thomas Cromwell becomes Secretary of State.
 23 May – Henry VIII's marriage with Catherine of Aragon officially declared annulled. Catherine refuses to accept this and continues to believe herself the wife of Henry until her death.
 28 May – Cranmer declares the marriage of Henry VIII and Anne Boleyn valid.
 1 June – Anne Boleyn crowned Queen at Westminster Abbey, the culmination of four days of ceremonies.
 11 July – Pope Clement VII excommunicates Henry VIII and also Archbishop Cranmer.
 7 September – Elizabeth I born to Henry VIII and Anne Boleyn at the Palace of Placentia in Greenwich.
 Sumptuary law, An Act for reformation of excess in apparel, passed.
 Buggery Act (applicable from 1534) makes buggery subject to the death penalty, the first time such acts have been legislated for outside the ecclesiastical courts.
 1534
 15 January – the English Reformation Parliament passes the Act Respecting the Oath to the Succession recognising the marriage of Henry VIII and Anne Boleyn, and their children as the legitimate heirs to the throne.
 20 April – Elizabeth Barton, "The Nun of Kent", executed for making prophesies against King Henry.
 Spring – Act for the Submission of the Clergy is confirmed by Parliament, requiring churchmen to submit to the king and forbidding the publication of ecclesiastical laws without royal permission.
 3 November–18 December – the Reformation Parliament passes the Act of Supremacy establishing Henry VIII as supreme head of the Church of England.
 Treasons Act makes it treason, punishable by death, to disavow the Act of Supremacy.
 Suffragan Bishops Act authorises the appointment of suffragan (i.e. assistant) bishops in England and Wales.
 Cambridge University Press is given a Royal Charter by Henry VIII and becomes the first of the privileged presses.
 Polydore Vergil's Anglica Historia is first published in Basel.
 1535
 January–May – Valor Ecclesiasticus: local commissioners survey the finances of religious establishments with a view to the imposition of a new tax by the Exchequer.
 March – English forces under William Skeffington storm Maynooth Castle in Ireland, the stronghold of Thomas FitzGerald, 10th Earl of Kildare.
 4 May – first of the Carthusian Martyrs of London executed at Tyburn.
 20 May – William Tyndale arrested in Antwerp for heresy in relation to his Bible translation into English.
 22 June – execution of Cardinal John Fisher, Bishop of Rochester, on Tower Hill in London for his refusal to swear an oath of loyalty to Henry VIII.
 6 July – Sir Thomas More is executed for treason on Tower Hill after refusing to agree to Henry VIII's decision to separate the English church from the Roman Catholic church.
 August – Commissioners begin to survey religious establishments, starting in the west of England, preparatory to dissolution of the Monasteries.
 4 October – publication of Myles Coverdale's complete Bible translation into English in Antwerp is completed. 
 First of the Laws in Wales Acts passed, beginning the Anglicisation of the Welsh legal system.
 Study of canon law at English universities prohibited.
 First appointment to the chair of Regius Professor of Divinity, founded by King Henry VIII: Richard Smyth at the University of Oxford.
 Beard tax introduced.
 1536
 7 January – Catherine of Aragon, first queen of Henry VIII, dies aged 50 in banishment at Kimbolton Castle, holding to the last that she is the country's only rightful queen.
 29 January
 Catherine of Aragon is buried at Peterborough Abbey.
 Anne Boleyn has a miscarriage.
 February – the Reformation Parliament passes the Suppression of Religious Houses Act ("Dissolution of the Lesser Monasteries Act").
 April – An Acte for Laws & Justice to be ministred in Wales in like fourme as it is in this Realme (27 Henry VIII c. 26) further incorporates the legal system of Wales into that of England.
 14 April – the Reformation Parliament passes an Act for the Dissolution of the Monasteries. Religious houses closed as part of Henry VIII's dissolution include
 Basingwerk Abbey
 Bourne Abbey
 Brinkburn Priory
 Buildwas Abbey
 Cartmel Priory
 Dorchester Abbey
 Dore Abbey
 Haltemprice Priory
 Keldholme Priory
 Lindisfarne Priory
 Tintern Abbey.
 The Court of Augmentations is set up to administer former religious revenues confiscated by the crown.
 May – William Tyndale's Bible publicly burned as heretical.
 2 May – Anne Boleyn is arrested and imprisoned in the Tower of London.
 14 May – Cranmer declares Henry's marriage to Anne Boleyn to be null and void.
 15 May – Anne Boleyn is tried and convicted in the Tower of London of adultery, incest, and high treason.
 17 May – the five men accused of adultery with Anne Boleyn, including her own brother George Boleyn, are executed.
 19 May – Anne Boleyn is beheaded by sword in the Tower of London.
 20 May – Henry VIII's betrothal to Jane Seymour is made public.
 30 May – Henry VIII marries Jane Seymour at the Palace of Westminster.
 11 July – Thomas Cranmer's Ten Articles are presented to Parliament.
 1 October–5 December – the Pilgrimage of Grace, a rebellion against Henry VIII's church reforms, beginning as the Lincolnshire Rising at St James' Church, Louth, and spreading to Yorkshire, from where it is led by Robert Aske.
 6 October – Bible translator William Tyndale burned at the stake in Vilvoorde, Flanders.
 29 October – coronation of Jane Seymour as queen consort of England (proclaimed 4 June).
 Act for Punishment of Sturdy Vagabonds and Beggars 1536 establishes the parish as the principal unit for administration of the Tudor Poor Laws.
 Sir Thomas Elyot's popular medical text The Castel of Helth is published.
 1537
 January – Bigod's Rebellion, an armed insurrection by Roman Catholics in Cumberland and Westmorland against the king.
 July – Pilgrimage of Grace: Robert Aske executed along with over 200 other rebels, including canons of Hexham Abbey.
 25 August – the Honourable Artillery Company, the oldest surviving regiment in the British Army and the second most senior, is formed.
 12 October – Jane Seymour gives birth to Prince Edward, a male heir to Henry VIII, at Hampton Court Palace; he is christened on 15 October.
 15 October – Council of the North meets for the first time, in York.
 24 October – Jane Seymour dies of complications from childbirth at Hampton Court Palace; on 12 November she receives a royal burial in St George's Chapel, Windsor Castle.
 Publication of complete Bible translations into English, both based on Tyndale's:
 Myles Coverdale's 1535 text, the first to be printed in England (by James Nicholson in Southwark)
 The Matthew Bible edited by John Rogers under the pseudonym "Thomas Matthew" and printed in Antwerp.
 Continuing Dissolution of the Monasteries by Henry VIII, from late summer mostly by voluntary surrender, including
 Bisham Priory (5 July, Bisham Abbey being founded by Henry in its place on 18 December to accommodate the Chertsey community)
 Bridlington Priory
 Castle Acre Priory
 Chertsey Abbey
 Furness Abbey
 Lewes Priory
 London Charterhouse
 Valle Crucis Abbey
 The Norfolk town of Bishop's Lynn becomes King's Lynn.
 Publication of An Introduction for to Lerne to Recken with the Pen and with the Counters, the first known English translation of an arithmetic textbook, at St Albans.
 1538
 2 May – Norwich Cathedral is dissolved as a monastic community.
 19 June – the newly founded Bisham Abbey is dissolved.
 July – Blackfriars, Oxford, is dissolved
 5 September – parish registers introduced.
 21 September (3 a.m.) – Cromwell's commissioners for the Dissolution of the Monasteries destroy the shrine of St. Swithun in Winchester Cathedral.
 1 October – Whitefriars, Coventry, is dissolved
 28 October – a phial hitherto claimed to contain Blood of Christ is removed from its shrine at Hailes Abbey to be brought to London for critical inspection.
 November – Austin Friars, London, is dissolved.
 30 November – Byland Abbey is dissolved.
 Late – Shrine of Our Lady of Walsingham is dissolved.
 John Bale's Kynge Johan is the earliest known English historical drama (in verse).
 Sir Thomas Elyot's Dictionary is published.
 1539
 12 January – Charles V, Holy Roman Emperor, and Francis I of France sign the Treaty of Toledo, agreeing to make no further alliances with the Kingdom of England.
 9 February – first horse race held at Chester Racecourse, the oldest in use in England.
 March
 Canterbury Cathedral surrenders, and reverts to its previous status of "a college of secular canons".
 Invasion scare, following reports of an alliance between Spain, France, and Scotland. The king orders construction of the 'Device Forts' for defence of the realm. Muster rolls are compiled in the counties.
 Council of the West established.
 April
 Printing of the Great Bible (The Byble in Englyshe) is completed and it is distributed to churches. Prepared by Myles Coverdale, it contains much material from the Tyndale Bible (unacknowledged as this version is officially considered heretical).
 Suppression of Religious Houses Act 1539 retrospectively legalises acts of voluntary surrender by the greater monasteries.
 May – the Six Articles reaffirm certain Catholic principles in Henry VIII's Church of England.
 19 September – Reading Abbey is suppressed and the Abbot, Hugh Cook Faringdon, indicted and hanged, drawn and quartered for treason, together with priests John Eynon and John Rugg, on 14 November. Also on 19 September, Glastonbury Abbey is suppressed by visitors without warning and Abbot Richard Whiting hanged on Glastonbury Tor on 15 November. The same fate befalls the abbot of St. John's Abbey, Colchester, Thomas Marshall, who is hanged on 1 December.
 4 October – a treaty is arranged for Henry VIII to marry Anne of Cleves.
 Dissolution of the Monasteries – Barking Abbey, Bath Abbey, Beaulieu Abbey, Colchester Abbey, Godstow Abbey, Hyde Abbey, Winchester, Newstead Abbey, St Albans Abbey, St Mary's Abbey, York, St Mary's Priory and Cathedral, Coventry, and Syon Abbey, together with the Devonshire foundations of Dunkeswell Abbey, Hartland and Tavistock Abbeys and Plympton Priory, are dissolved. Hailes Abbey is surrendered on 24 December.
 Game Place House in Great Yarmouth becomes the first premises to be used regularly as a public theatre.

Births 
 1530
Thomas Hoby, diplomat and translator (died 1566)
 Approximate date
Richard Tarlton, actor (died 1588)
 Nicholas Sanders, Catholic propagandist (died 1581)
 1531
 September – Henry Stanley, 4th Earl of Derby (died 1594)
 14 November – Richard Topcliffe, landowner and Member of Parliament (died 1604)
 John Popham, Lord Chief Justice of England (died 1607)
 1532
 24 June – Robert Dudley, 1st Earl of Leicester, politician (died 1588)
 William Allen, cardinal (died 1594)
 John Hawkins, navigator (died 1595)
 Henry Percy, 8th Earl of Northumberland, nobleman and conspirator (suicide 1585)
 Thomas Norton, lawyer (died 1584)
 Approximate date – Ralph Lane, explorer (died 1603)
 1533
 7 September – Queen Elizabeth I of England (died 1603)
 Approximate date – Thomas Stafford aristocrat and rebel (executed 1557)
1534
 18 April – William Harrison, clergyman (died 1593)
 7 June – Amy Robsart, wife of Robert Dudley, 1st Earl of Leicester (died 1560)
 1535
 William Butler, physician (died 1617)
 Jasper Heywood, translator of Seneca and theologian (died 1598)
 Thomas North, translator (died c. 1604)
 Approximate date
Lord Guilford Dudley, son of John Dudley, Duke of Northumberland (executed 1554)
 Robert Parsons, composer (died 1572)
1536
 10 March – Thomas Howard, 4th Duke of Norfolk, politician (executed 1572)
 c. September – Laurence Chaderton, Puritan academic and churchman (died 1640)
 Thomas Sackville, 1st Earl of Dorset, statesman and poet (died 1608)
 Roger Marbeck, chief physician to Elizabeth I (died 1604)
 Charles Howard, 1st Earl of Nottingham, statesman and admiral (died 1624)
1537
 28 June – Philip Howard, 20th Earl of Arundel, nobleman (died 1595)
 12 October – King Edward VI of England (died 1553)
 12 October or earlier – Lady Jane Grey, claimant to the throne of England (executed 1554)
Jane Lumley, translator (died 1578)
1538
 6 January – Jane Dormer, lady-in-waiting to Mary I (died 1612)
 21 September – Lewis Mordaunt, 3rd Baron Mordaunt, Member of Parliament (died 1601)
 Approximate date – Henry Herbert, 2nd Earl of Pembroke, statesman (died 1601)

Deaths 
 1530
 29 November – Cardinal Thomas Wolsey, statesman (born c. 1473)
1532
 31 January – Edward Sutton, 2nd Baron Dudley (born 1460)
 May – Elizabeth Stafford, Countess of Sussex (year of birth unknown)
 22 August – William Warham, Archbishop of Canterbury (born 1450)
1533
 28 April – Nicholas West, bishop and diplomat (born 1461)
 25 June – Mary Tudor, Queen of France and English Princess (born 1496)
 4 July – John Frith, Protestant priest and martyr (born 1503)
1534
 20 April – Elizabeth Barton, nun (executed) (born 1506)
 8 November – William Blount, 4th Baron Mountjoy, scholar and patron (born c. 1478)
 Sir Edward Guildford, Lord Warden of the Cinque Ports (born c. 1474)
 Humphrey Kynaston, highwayman and outlaw (born c. 1474)
 John Taylor, Master of the Rolls (born c. 1480)
1535
 4 May – John Houghton, Robert Lawrence, Augustine Webster, Prior and monks of the London Charterhouse, along with Richard Reynolds, Bridgettine monk of Syon (executed)
 22 June – John Fisher, Bishop of Rochester (executed) (born c. 1469)
 6 July – Sir Thomas More, lawyer, writer, and politician (executed) (born 1478)
 September – George Nevill, 5th Baron Bergavenny (born 1469)
 31 December – William Skeffington, Lord Deputy of Ireland (born 1465)
1536
 7 January – Catherine of Aragon, queen of Henry VIII (born 1485)
 17 May – George Boleyn, Viscount Rochford, diplomat (born 1503)
 19 May – Anne Boleyn, queen of Henry VIII (executed)
 18 June – Henry Fitzroy, 1st Duke of Richmond and Somerset, illegitimate son of Henry VIII (born 1519)
 28 June – Richard Pace, diplomat (born 1482)
 c. July – John Rastell, printer and author (born c. 1475)
 6 October – William Tyndale, Protestant scholar (burned at the stake) (born 1484)
 21 December – Sir John Seymour, courtier (born 1474)
1537
 29 June – Henry Percy, 6th Earl of Northumberland (born 1502)
 24 October – Jane Seymour, queen of Henry VIII (complications of childbirth) (born c. 1507)
1538
 3 April – Elizabeth Boleyn, Countess of Wiltshire (born c. 1480)
 8 May – Edward Foxe, churchman (born 1496)
 22 May – John Forrest, Franciscan friar (martyred) (born 1471)
 22 November – John Lambert, Protestant martyr (burned at stake) (year of birth unknown)
1539
 12 March – Thomas Boleyn, 1st Earl of Wiltshire, diplomat and politician (born 1477)
 8 September – John Stokesley, prelate (born 1475)
 14 November – Hugh Cook Faringdon, Abbot of Reading (hanged) (year of birth unknown)

References